The USWA Junior Heavyweight Championship was a short-lived title in the United States Wrestling Association that lasted from 1990 to 1991.

Title history

Footnotes

United States Wrestling Association championships
Junior heavyweight wrestling championships